The 1986–87 season was Heart of Midlothian F.C.s 4th consecutive season of play in the Scottish Premier Division. Hearts also competed in the UEFA Cup, Scottish Cup, Scottish League Cup and the East of Scotland Shield.

Fixtures

Friendlies

Uefa Cup

League Cup

Scottish Cup

East of Scotland Shield

Scottish Premier Division

Scottish Premier Division table

Squad information

See also
List of Heart of Midlothian F.C. seasons

References 

 Statistical Record 86-87

External links 
 Official Club website

Heart of Midlothian F.C. seasons
Heart of Midlothian